Jean-Paul Audet,  (December 7, 1918 – November 12, 1993) was a French Canadian academic and philosopher.

He was a professor and former head of the Université de Montréal's Department of Philosophy.

In 1988, he was made an Officer of the Order of Canada for his "contribution to the field of theology". In 1969, he was awarded the Molson Prize. In 1970, he was made a Fellow of the Royal Society of Canada.

Bibliography 

 (reprint)
 (reprint)
 (reprint)
 (reprint)

External links
Biography 
Bibliography at Les Editions des Sources 

1918 births
1993 deaths
Fellows of the Royal Society of Canada
Officers of the Order of Canada
Academics in Quebec
Canadian non-fiction writers in French
20th-century Canadian philosophers